The 30th Assembly District of Wisconsin is one of 99 districts in the Wisconsin State Assembly. Located in northwest Wisconsin, the district comprises most of western St. Croix County and part of northwest Pierce County.  It includes the city of Hudson and part of the city of River Falls, as well as the village of North Hudson.  It also contains the Willow River State Park and Kinnickinnic State Park.  The district is represented by Republican Shannon Zimmerman, since January 2017.

The 30th Assembly district is located within Wisconsin's 10th Senate district, along with the 28th and 29th Assembly districts.

History
The district was created in the 1972 redistricting act (1971 Wisc. Act 304) which first established the numbered district system, replacing the previous system which allocated districts to specific counties.  The 30th district was drawn mostly in line with the boundaries of the previous Buffalo County–Pepin County–Pierce County district, exchanging part of northeast Pierce County for part of western Trempealeau County.  The last representative of the Buffalo–Pepin–Pierce district, Michael P. Early, was elected in 1972 as the first representative of the 30th Assembly district.

Following the 1982 court-ordered redistricting, which scrambled all State Assembly districts, the 1983 redistricting moved the 30th district back to Pierce County and southern St. Croix County, where it has remained through subsequent redistricting cycles with slight variations in boundaries.

List of past representatives

References 

Wisconsin State Assembly districts
Pierce County, Wisconsin
St. Croix County, Wisconsin